Norton in Hales is a civil parish in Shropshire, England.  It contains 21 listed buildings that are recorded in the National Heritage List for England.  Of these, five are at Grade II*, the middle of the three grades, and the others are at Grade II, the lowest grade.  The parish contains the villages of Norton in Hales and Betton and the surrounding countryside.  The Shropshire Union Canal passes through the parish; two bridges crossing it and two mileposts on the towpath are listed.  In the parish are two country houses which are listed together with associated structures.  The oldest listed building in the parish is a church; this is listed together with items in the churchyard.  The other listed buildings are houses, farmhouses, farm buildings, and a bridge carrying a road over the River Tern.
 

Key

Buildings

References

Citations

Sources

Lists of buildings and structures in Shropshire